Endertia is a genus of flowering plants in the family Fabaceae. It belongs to the subfamily Detarioideae. It contains a single species, Endertia spectabilis.

Detarioideae
Monotypic Fabaceae genera